BBC History of World War II (1989–2005) is a 30-hour, 12-disc collection of 10 BBC television films about World War II. The films include documentaries, docudramas, and "dramatized documentaries" (inter-cutting of historical footage with dramatic recreations).

The films
1. The Nazis: A Warning from History (1997, 6 Episodes, 290 minutes, 4:3 Full screen, 2 Discs) 
Documentary on the reasons behind the rise and fall of the Nazis and of Nazi Germany.

2. The Road to War: Great Britain, Italy, Japan, USA (1989, 2 Episodes, 190 minutes, 4:3 Fullscreen, 1 Disc) 
Documentary on how Germany, Britain, France, Canada, Italy, the Soviet Union, Japan and the USA entered the war.  Narrator is Charles Wheeler.

3. Dunkirk (2004, 3 Episodes, 176 minutes, 16:9 Anamorphic, 1 Disc) 
Docudrama on the evacuation from Dunkirk.

4. War of the Century: When Hitler Fought Stalin (1999, 4 Episodes, 190 minutes, 4:3 Fullscreen, 1 Disc) 
Documentary on the Russo-German War.

5. Battle of the Atlantic (2002, 3 Episodes, 146 minutes, 16:9 Anamorphic, 1 Disc) 
Documentary on the U-boats and the Atlantic convoys.

6. Horror in the East: Japan and the Atrocities of World War II (2000, 2 Episodes, 98 minutes, 4:3 Fullscreen, 1 Disc) 
Documentary on the Japanese Army's atrocities in the Asia-Pacific war and why the Japanese fought to the death.  Supplements on the Indian Army and the Burma War.

7. Battlefields (2001, 4 Episodes, 194 minutes, 16:9 Anamorphic, 1 Disc) 
Documentary on El Alamein, Monte Cassino, the Battle of Arnhem and RAF Bomber Command [Episode Name:  "Bomber"] on the firebombing of German cities.  Presenter is Prof. Richard Holmes.

8. D-Day 6.6.1944 (2004, 2 Episodes, 90 minutes, 16:9 Anamorphic, 1 Disc) 
Docudrama on the events surrounding D-Day.

9. D-Day to Berlin (2004, 3 Episodes, 150 minutes, 16:9 Anamorphic, 1 Disc) 
Docudrama on the breakout from Normandy, Operation Market Garden, the Battle of the Bulge and the German surrender. Presenter is Sean Bean.

10. Auschwitz: The Nazis and the 'Final Solution' (2005, 6 Episodes, 300 minutes, 16:9 Anamorphic, 2 Discs) 
"Dramatized documentary" on the Nazis' conceptualisation and implementation of the Final Solution.

See also
Hiroshima (2005), another "dramatized documentary" marketed as part of the BBC History of World War II
World War II Behind Closed Doors: Stalin, the Nazis and the West (2008), another BBC "dramatized documentary" 
The World at War, a 1970s series by Thames Television

References

 
Documentary television series about World War II